Phillip Mikaera Tataurangi (born 31 October 1971) is a New Zealand golfer.

Tataurangi was born in Auckland. In 1992 he was a member of the New Zealand's winning Eisenhower Trophy team and was the leading individual player in the tournament. He turned professional in 1993 and has played mainly in the United States as a pro. The highlights of his professional career include winning the 1996 Australian PGA Championship and the 2002 Invensys Classic on the PGA Tour.

Amateur wins
1992 New South Wales Medal
1993 New Zealand Amateur

Professional wins (3)

PGA Tour wins (1)

PGA Tour of Australasia wins (1)

Nike Tour wins (1)

Results in major championships

Note: Tataurangi never played in The Open Championship.

CUT = missed the half-way cut
"T" = tied

Results in The Players Championship

CUT = missed the halfway cut

Results in World Golf Championships

QF, R16, R32, R64 = Round in which player lost in match play

Team appearances
Amateur
Eisenhower Trophy (representing New Zealand): 1988, 1992 (team winners and individual leader)
Nomura Cup (representing New Zealand): 1989, 1993

Professional
World Cup (representing New Zealand): 1996

See also
1993 PGA Tour Qualifying School graduates
1996 PGA Tour Qualifying School graduates
2001 PGA Tour Qualifying School graduates

References

External links

New Zealand male golfers
PGA Tour of Australasia golfers
PGA Tour golfers
Golfers from Auckland
Sportspeople from Taupō
Golfers from Dallas
1971 births
Living people